The Aloha Tower Marketplace is a waterfront shopping center in Honolulu, Hawaii. Located at the Honolulu Harbor, the Aloha Tower Marketplace includes several national historic landmarks including the Aloha Tower, Falls of Clyde and Hawaii Maritime Center.

History 
Aloha Tower Marketplace was completed in 1994 as part of a Honolulu Harbor commercial revitalization project. It was acquired by Aloha Tower LP in 1998.

In 2002, the Marketplace filed for bankruptcy. It had been operating at a loss because of its distance from other tourist areas, lack of parking, and mismanagement. The bankruptcy led to the reorganization of shops in the Marketplace.

The museum at the Falls of Clyde focused on historic sailing and Polynesian sailing customs. Occasionally, outrigger canoes were displayed at the Hawaii Maritime Center as well. The museum closed May 1, 2009 due to lack of revenue.

Hawaii Pacific University partnered with a developer to own the Marketplace in 2011, and a few years later in 2013, they bought out the developer and took complete control of the facility. They renovated the shopping center into a mixed-use facility with retail, restaurant, and HPU student dormitories. The redevelopment, which began in 2012 has been complicated by disputes between development entities, permitting issues and staff-reductions. The project was completed in 2015.

Dining and entertainment
Prior to the renovation, major annual events occurred at Aloha Tower Marketplace, including fireworks displays on the Fourth of July and New Year's Eve, ukulele contests, and Cinco de Mayo celebrations. The Great Aloha Run passes the Aloha Tower Marketplace.

References

External links
 Official website

Shopping malls in Hawaii
Shopping malls established in 1994
Buildings and structures in Honolulu
Tourist attractions in Honolulu
1994 establishments in Hawaii